DEHA may refer to:

 DEHA (apparel), an Italian dancewear label
 Bis(2-ethylhexyl) adipate, a plasticizer
 Diethylhydroxylamine, another chemical also used in plastics

See also
Deha (disambiguation)